Geoffrey Collins is an Australian flautist. Along with David Miller he was nominated for the 1990 ARIA Award for Best Classical Album for their album Flute Australia Volume 2.

Collins is Principal Flute for the Adelaide Symphony Orchestra and a member of Australia Ensemble.

Disocography

Albums

Awards and nominations

ARIA Music Awards
The ARIA Music Awards is an annual awards ceremony that recognises excellence, innovation, and achievement across all genres of Australian music. They commenced in 1987. 

! 
|-
| 1990
| Flute Australia Volume 2 (with David Miller)
| Best Classical Album
| 
| 
|-

References

External links
Geoffrey Collins, Flute bio at Australian Youth Orchestra
Biographical cuttings on Geoffrey Collins, musician, containing one or more cuttings from newspapers or journals at the National Library of Australia

Living people
Australian musicians
Year of birth missing (living people)